The 1989 UCF Knights football season was the eleventh for the team. It was Gene McDowell's fifth season as the head coach of the Knights. The season marked UCF's last in Division II, as the Knight would move to Division I-AA in 1990. The team posted an overall record of 7–3 in 1989 but failed to make the Division II Playoffs.

As a Division II team in 1989, UCF defeated multiple Division I-AA teams, including two nationally ranked schools. On October 28, UCF upset No. 9 Liberty (I-AA), and two weeks later on November 11, defeated No. 4 Eastern Kentucky (I-AA). Against Eastern Kentucky, quarterback Rudy Jones led a fourth quarter comeback, throwing two touchdown passes to lift the Knights to a 20–19 victory.

The team played their home games at the Citrus Bowl in Downtown Orlando. During the decade of the 1980s, the Knights compiled an overall record of 47–59–1 (.443)

Schedule

References

UCF
UCF Knights football seasons
UCF Knights football